The Allondon is a river in France (Auvergne-Rhône-Alpes region) and Switzerland (canton of Geneva). Its source is located at  elevation in the commune of Échenevex in the Ain department in eastern France. It flows into the Rhône at the village of Russin in the canton of Geneva in Switzerland. It is home to the only recently known population of the rare insect Lachesilla rossica.

References

External links 

Rivers of France
Rivers of Switzerland
Rivers of Auvergne-Rhône-Alpes
Rivers of the canton of Geneva
Rivers of Ain
International rivers of Europe
Ramsar sites in Metropolitan France
Ramsar sites in Switzerland